Karegaran Stadium is a football ground located in Tehran that Persepolis F.C. trains on. Before being occupied by Persepolis F.C., the stadium was tenanted by Steel Azin F.C.

Stadium
Football venues in Iran
Sports venues in Tehran